Dora L. Costa (born 1964) is an American economics professor at the University of California, Los Angeles where she is the Kenneth L. Sokoloff Professor of Economic History. She is also the department chair of the economics department. In addition to her teaching position, Costa is a research associate at the National Bureau of Economic Research (NBER).

She is married to fellow economist Matthew Edwin Kahn who is a professor at the University of Southern California's economics department and a Bloomberg Distinguished Professor at Johns Hopkins University's Economics Department and Business School.

Early life and education
Costa was born in Berkeley, California to Dr. Natalia Costa and Dr. Gustavo Costa in 1964. Costa earned her Bachelors of Arts degree in economics and mathematics from the University of California, Berkeley in 1986. She went on to earn an M.A. in economics in 1988 before earning her Ph.D. in Economics in 1993 both from the University of Chicago.

Career
After receiving her Ph.D., Costa accepted an assistant professor position at the Massachusetts Institute of Technology in 1993. She later became a Ford Career Development Associate Professor in 1997 before becoming an associate professor with tenure in 2000 and finally a full professor in 2003 at MIT, leaving in 2008. Since 2007, Costa is a professor of economics at UCLA, where she teaches economic history and health economics. In 2017, she became both the Kenneth T. Sokoloff Professor of Economic History and a department chair (from 2017-2021).

Her affiliation with NBER began in 1993 as a faculty research fellow before becoming a research associate in 2000. She is currently a researcher on their programs on the Development of the American Economy and on Aging and the director of the NBER working group Cohort Studies since 2000 as well.

Costa has also worked for the California Center for Population Research, holding the position of associate director from 2007 to 2017. From 2014 to 2016, Costa was on the executive committee of the American Economic Association. She was also on the Sub-Committee on Non-Discrimination in the Economics Profession from 2015-2017 and the nominating committee in 2016. Her past experiences include positions on editorial boards as well, including the American Economic Review, the Journal of Economic Literature, and a current position at Cliometrica, Journal of Economic Perspectives.

Research
Costa's research focuses on interpretations of labor economics, demography, and health through American economic history. Her research has covered several topics including but not limited to retirement, elderly living, older age mortality and morbidity, trends in population health and leisure, CPI bias, and social capital. A majority of her research compares and examines cross-sectional relations from the past and present have been changing. This is done with the goal of better informing our understanding of the future in these topics. She has written numerous works such as:
 Heroes and Cowards: The Social Face of War 
 The Evolution of Retirement: An American Economic History 1880-1990
 Understanding Long-Run Economic Growth
 Health and Labor Force Participation Over the Life Cycle: Evidence from the Past
 Leaders: Privilege, Sacrifice, Opportunity and Personnel Economics in the American Civil War
 Surviving Andersonville: The Benefits of Social Networks in POW Camps
 Energy Conservation ‘Nudges’ and Environmental Ideology: Evidence from a Randomized Residential Electricity Field Experiment
 From Mill Town to Board Room: The Rise of Women's Paid Labor
 Power Couples: Changes in the Locational Choice of the College Educated, 1940-1990
Her current research focuses on two topics. First, she is investigating long-term trends in health inequality by social class at all stages of the life cycle. She also analyzes the effect of childhood health on morbidity and economic outcomes at older ages. The second topic is the intergenerational and transgenerational transmission of health and socioeconomic status.

Recognition
Costa has been awarded the Alfred P. Sloan Research Fellowship and was a fellow at both the Center for Advanced Study in the Behavioral and Social Sciences and NBER. She was awarded the Allen Nevins Prize for outstanding dissertation in U.S. economic history in 1994 by the Economic History Association. Her paper, "The Evolution of Retirement: An American Economic History 1880-1990" received the TIAA-CREF's 1998 Paul A. Samuelson Award for Outstanding Scholarly Writing on Lifelong Financial Security. In 2014, her article in the journal Law, Economics and Organization won the Oliver E. Williamson Prize for Best Article.

References

Bibliography
 Heroes and Cowards: The Social Face of War (joint with Matthew Kahn). 2008. Princeton University Press.
 The Evolution of Retirement: An American Economic History 1880-1990. 1998. University of Chicago Press.
 Understanding Long-Run Economic Growth. 2011. (joint co-editor with Naomi Lamoreaux) University of Chicago Press for NBER.
 Health and Labor Force Participation Over the Life Cycle: Evidence from the Past. 2003. University of Chicago Press for NBER.
 “Leaders: Privilege, Sacrifice, Opportunity and Personnel Economics in the American Civil War.” (First published on-line, June 14, 2013.) Journal of Law, Economics, and Organization. 30(3): 437-62. 
 "Surviving Andersonville: The Benefits of Social Networks in POW Camps." (joint with Matthew Kahn) 2007. American Economic Review. 97(4): 1467-1487.
 “Energy Conservation ‘Nudges’ and Environmental Ideology: Evidence from a Randomized Residential Electricity Field Experiment.” (joint with Matthew Kahn). 2013. Journal of the European Economic Association. 11(3): 680-702.
 "From Mill Town to Board Room: The Rise of Women's Paid Labor." Journal of Economic Perspectives. Fall 2000. 14(4): 101-122. 
 "Power Couples: Changes in the Locational Choice of the College Educated, 1940-1990." (joint with Matthew E. Kahn), Quarterly Journal of Economics. November 2000. 115(4): 1287-1315.

External links 
 CV
 Home Page of Dora Costa - UCLA Economics

1964 births
Living people
21st-century American economists
American women economists
UC Berkeley College of Letters and Science alumni
University of Chicago alumni
21st-century American women